The Governmental Accounting Standards Board Statements (GASB Statements in short) are issued by GASB to set generally accepted accounting principles (GAAP) for state and local governments in the United States of America. These statements are the most authoritative source for governmental GAAP. Other business entities follow statements issued by Financial Accounting Standards Board (FASB).

See also
Governmental Accounting Standards Board

External links
GASB Statements: Summaries & Status

United States Generally Accepted Accounting Principles